EGAD may refer to:

Embryonic GAD, the GAD25 and GAD44 forms of the enzyme glutamate decarboxylase.
the ICAO code for Newtownards Airport in Northern Ireland.